Polyethylene glycol propylene glycol cocoates or PEG propylene glycol cocoates are chemical compounds produced by the esterification of polyoxyalkyl alcohols with lauric acid. Their chemical designation is PEG-8, referring to its polyethylene glycol (PEG) molecular chain length.

Uses
PEG propylene glycol cocoates are used in cosmetics and toothpaste to form emulsions, which they do by reducing surface tension in the substances of which an emulsified form is required.

References

Cosmetics chemicals